Smorodichny is a rural locality (a selo) under the administrative jurisdiction of the Settlement of Sangar in Kobyaysky District of the Sakha Republic, Russia, located  from Sangar proper. It had no recorded population as of the 2002 Census.

References

Notes

Sources
Official website of the Sakha Republic. Registry of the Administrative-Territorial Divisions of the Sakha Republic. Kobyaysky District. 

Rural localities in Kobyaysky District
Populated places on the Lena River